Gryton was a Boeotian potter who worked in the first half of the 6th century BC. He is only known by his signature on the sole of a plastic aryballos in the shape of a sandal-clad foot, which is housed in the Museum of Fine Arts in Boston. A catalogue of his works was published by Raubitschek along with works of ancient Boeotian potters. These included the Ring Aryballos, which is part of a collection of Berlin's Staatliche Museen.

An interpretation of Rudolf Wachter based on the inscriptions of Boeotian vases also identified Gryton as a name derived from γρύτα, which meant container of ointments.

References

Anthony E. Raubitschek, Isabelle K. Raubitschek: Early Boeotian Potters. In Hesperia. 35, 1966, p. 154–165. 
Rainer Vollkommer: Gryton. Artists lexicon of antiquity. Bd  1, 2001, p. 272 
Rudolf Wachter: Non-attic Greek vase inscriptions. Oxford 2001, p. 9

Ancient Boeotians
Ancient Greek potters